The 57th parallel south is a circle of latitude that is 57 degrees south of the Earth's equatorial plane.  No land lies on the parallel — it crosses nothing but ocean.

At this latitude the sun is visible for 17 hours, 53 minutes during the December solstice and 6 hours, 43 minutes during the June solstice.

The maximum altitude of the Sun is > 18.00º in April and > 11.00º in May.

Everyday of the month of October can view both astronomical dawn and dusk regardless of the meridian.

Around the world
Starting at the Prime Meridian and heading eastwards, the parallel 57° south passes through:

{| class="wikitable plainrowheaders"
! scope="col" width="125" | Co-ordinates
! scope="col" | Ocean
! scope="col" | Notes
|-
| style="background:#b0e0e6;" | 
! scope="row" style="background:#b0e0e6;" | Atlantic Ocean
| style="background:#b0e0e6;" |
|-
| style="background:#b0e0e6;" | 
! scope="row" style="background:#b0e0e6;" | Indian Ocean
| style="background:#b0e0e6;" |
|-
| style="background:#b0e0e6;" | 
! scope="row" style="background:#b0e0e6;" | Pacific Ocean
| style="background:#b0e0e6;" | Passing through the Drake Passage between South America and the Antarctic Peninsula
|-
| style="background:#b0e0e6;" | 
! scope="row" style="background:#b0e0e6;" | Atlantic Ocean
| style="background:#b0e0e6;" | Running through the Scotia Sea, passing just north of Vindication Island and Candlemas Island,  (claimed by )
|}

See also
56th parallel south
58th parallel south

References

s57